Prince Albert Charles Anthony Louis William Victor of Saxony, Duke of Saxony (25 February 1875 – 16 September 1900) was a Saxon prince from the House of Wettin. He was the youngest son of King Georg I of Saxony (son of King Johann I of Saxony and his consort Princess Amalie Auguste of Bavaria) and his wife, Infanta Maria Ana of Portugal (daughter of Queen Maria II of Portugal and her consort, Prince Ferdinand of Saxe-Coburg and Gotha-Kohary).

He died on 16 September 1900 in a traffic accident.  A phaeton driven by Miguel de Bragança hit Albert's carriage so violently that the carriage overturned into a ditch.  Albert died from his wounds a few hours later. There were rumours that Miguel had done this on purpose, but this was never proven.  Because it could not be determined whether this was an accident or intentional, Miguel escaped a court martial.  However, he had to resign from his army post and leave the country.

Footnotes 

House of Wettin
1875 births
1900 deaths
Saxon princes
19th-century German people
Albertine branch
Grand Crosses of the Order of Saint Stephen of Hungary
Road incident deaths in Germany
Burials at Dresden Cathedral
Sons of kings